The Elgin Transportation Center is the main local bus station in Elgin, Illinois serving as the central hub for the Pace bus system in the Elgin area.  The station is located next to the Elgin Metra terminal on the west bank of the Fox River.

Bus routes
Pace
  541 Northeast Elgin 
  542 Bluff City 
  543 Dundee/Carpentersville 
  546 Orange/Walnut 
  547 Wing Park 
  548 Highland 
  549 South Randall 
  550 Elgin Transportation Center/Crystal Lake 
  552 North State/Spring Hill Mall 
  554 Elgin/Woodfield 
  603 Elgin Transportation Center/Rosemont Express 
  801 Elgin/Geneva

Train connection

Metra
Elgin

References

Bus stations in Illinois
Transportation in Kane County, Illinois
Elgin, Illinois